State Highway 261 (MN 261) was a  highway in McLeod County, Minnesota. It ran from Winsted to U.S. Highway 212 east of Glencoe. It was turned back to McLeod County maintenance in 1996, becoming County State-aid Highway 1.

Highway 261 was known as 6th Street in Winsted, and Babcock Avenue, 180th Street, and Dairy Avenue elsewhere in the county.

Route description
Highway 261 served as a north–south route between the communities of Winsted, Winsted Township, Bergen Township, Lester Prairie, and Helen Township. The highway's southern terminus was at U.S. 212 just outside the city of Glencoe.

The entire route was located in McLeod County.

History
Highway 261 was authorized on July 1, 1949. It was paved between Winsted and Lester Prairie in 1950 and between Lester Prairie and Highway 212 in 1953.

It was decommissioned in 1996, becoming County State-aid Highway 1.

Major intersections

References

External links

Highway 261 at the Unofficial Minnesota Highways Page

261